Applause, Applause... is a 1984 Soviet musical film directed by Viktor Buturlin.

Plot 
The film tells about an entertaining artist who dreams of playing a dramatic role. And suddenly she gets such an opportunity.

Cast 
 Lyudmila Gurchenko
 Oleg Tabakov as Shevtsov
 Olga Volkova
 Aleksandr Filippenko	
 Karina Moritts
 Aleksandr Shirvindt
 Tatyana Parkina
 Gelena Ivlieva
 Lev Lemke
 Algirdas Paulavicius

References

External links 
 

1984 films
1980s Russian-language films
Soviet musical drama films
1980s musical drama films